was the seventeenth of twenty-four s, built for the Imperial Japanese Navy following World War I. When introduced into service, these ships were the most powerful destroyers in the world. They served as first-line destroyers through the 1930s, and remained formidable weapons systems well into the Pacific War.

History
Construction of the advanced Fubuki-class destroyers was authorized as part of the Imperial Japanese Navy's expansion program from fiscal 1923, intended to give Japan a qualitative edge with the world's most modern ships. The Fubuki class had performance that was a quantum leap over previous destroyer designs, so much so that they were designated . The large size, powerful engines, high speed, large radius of action and unprecedented armament gave these destroyers the firepower similar to many light cruisers in other navies. Oboro, built at the Sasebo Naval Arsenal, was the seventh in an improved series, which incorporated a modified gun turret that could elevate her main battery of Type 3 127 mm 50 caliber naval guns to 75° as opposed to the original 40°, thus permitting the guns to be used as dual purpose guns against aircraft. Oboro was laid down on 29 November 1930, launched on 8 November 1930 and commissioned on 31 October 1931. Originally assigned hull designation “Destroyer No. 51”, she was commissioned as Oboro.

The 4th Fleet Incident occurred only a year after her commissioning, and Oboro was quickly taken back to the shipyards to have her hull strengthened.

Operational history
On completion, Oboro was assigned to Destroyer Division 20 under the IJN 2nd Fleet. During the Second Sino-Japanese War, from 1937, Oboro covered landing of Japanese forces in Shanghai and Hangzhou. From 1940, she was assigned to patrol and cover landings of Japanese forces in south China and in the Invasion of French Indochina.

World War II history
At the time of the attack on Pearl Harbor, Oboro was assigned to Carrier Division 5 of the IJN 1st Air Fleet, and had deployed from Yokosuka Naval District to Hahajima in the Bonin Islands, from which it subsequently provided cover for Japanese landing operations in the Invasion of Guam.

From mid-December to April 1942, Oboro was based at Kwajalein, and from mid-April to the end of August 1942, Oboro was based at Yokosuka, patrolling in the nearby waters, and escorting convoys from Yokosuka to Ōminato Guard District to the north, and Mako Guard District to the southwest.

On 11 October 1942, Oboro departed Yokosuka with a re-supply convoy for Kiska in the Japanese-occupied Aleutian Islands. A direct bomb hit among munitions being carried caused the ship to explode and sink, leaving only 17 survivors, including her captain (LtCdr Hiro Yamana), who were rescued by the destroyer  (also heavily damaged in the same attack).

On 15 November 1942, Oboro was removed from the navy list.

Notes

References

External links

Fubuki-class destroyers
Ships built by Sasebo Naval Arsenal
1930 ships
Second Sino-Japanese War naval ships of Japan
World War II destroyers of Japan
Ships of the Aleutian Islands campaign
Destroyers sunk by aircraft
Shipwrecks in the Bering Sea
World War II shipwrecks in the Pacific Ocean
Maritime incidents in October 1942
Ships sunk by US aircraft
Naval magazine explosions